Merzlyakov (from мерзнуть meaning to freeze, be cold) is a Russian masculine surname. Its feminine counterpart is Merzlyakova. It may refer to
Aleksey Merzlyakov (1778–1830), Russian poet, critic and translator
Yuri Merzlyakov (born 1949), Russian diplomat

References 

Russian-language surnames